Brentford F.C. Reserves was the reserve team of Brentford. The reserve team played at varying times from 1900 until 2011. During the 2012 off-season, the English reserve football pyramid and youth system was overhauled under the Elite Player Performance Plan and replaced with a new Academy system and development leagues. Brentford's reserve team was relaunched as the Brentford Development Squad in 2011 and in 2012 it began competing in Professional Development League 2 South. After closing the academy in May 2016, the club withdrew from the Elite Player Performance Plan and Professional Development League and launched a new Brentford B team. Following the first team's promotion to the Premier League in 2021, the club reopened its academy in time for the start of the 2022–23 season, under the Elite Player Performance Plan, while retaining the B team.

Reserve team

Background 
Brentford Reserves was formed to give young players and first team players returning from injury game time in a competitive environment. The ever-changing structure of the game in England in the late 19th and early 20th centuries saw the Brentford reserve team included in leagues competing against the first teams of amateur clubs. On occasion, the reserve team would compete in two leagues simultaneously. Upon the Football League's acceptance of the Premier League's Elite Player Performance Plan in 2011, which replaced reserve teams with U21 Development Squads, the reserve team was permanently disbanded. Winger Micky Ball made the most appearances for the reserve team, 159, without having ever made a first team appearance. Two other players made more than 150 reserve team appearances – Fred Ryecraft and Johnny Hales.

London League (1900–1914) 
The reserve team entered the London League First Division in the 1900–01 season and finished 8th out of 11. Following a demotion, the reserves were London League Second Division champions in 1902–03 and earned promotion back to the First Division. They finished third in the First Division in the 1903–04 season and were promoted to the Premier Division for 1904–05, finishing in 8th place. Bottom and second-from-bottom finishes saw the team back in the First Division for the 1908–09 season, which saw the reserves promoted back to the Premier Division as champions. They achieved their highest Premier Division placing in 1909–10, finishing fifth. Mid-table finishes followed in the Premier Division until 1913–14 when, competing for the first time in an all-professional reserve league, Brentford Reserves finished bottom in their final season in the league before the outbreak of the First World War.

Great Western Suburban League (1905–1911) 
The reserve team entered the Great Western Suburban League for the 1905–06 season and finished as champions in 1907–08, 1908–09 and 1910–11 and runners up in 1905–06, 1906–07 and 1909–10. Their main rivals during those years were Reading Reserves, Hounslow and Shepherd's Bush. The 1910–11 title win (in which the team failed to win only two of its games and was unbeaten during the season) forced the league's management to ban professional clubs from competing, which caused Brentford's departure from the league.

South Eastern League (1914–1915) 
Brentford Reserves competed in the South Eastern League during the 1914–15 season, but due to falling attendances brought on by the First World War, the team was withdrawn from the league in January 1915 and its record was expunged.

Football Combination (1919–1967, 1998–2004, 2009–2011) 
The reserve team spent much of its existence competing in the Football Combination. Brentford Reserves were London Combination (as the Football Combination was known then) champions in 1931–32 and 1932–33. The title-clinching game on 6 May 1933, against Aldershot Reserves was watched by a crowd of over 9,000 at Griffin Park, the club record for a reserve team fixture. A notable achievement was 43-game winning run at Griffin Park between November 1931 and November 1933. Much of the success in those two seasons was down to the prolific goalscoring of Ralph Allen. Overspending and the subsequent cutting of costs forced the club to disband the reserve team and quit the Football Combination in 1967. The reserves re-joined the Football Combination for the 1998–99 season and a notable third-place finish was achieved in 2001–02. The reserve team was withdrawn from competition in 2004, but was revived and won election to the Football Combination Central Division in 2009. The team played for two seasons before being replaced by the Brentford Development Squad in 2011. During its final two seasons, the reserve team played its home games at Griffin Park.

London Midweek League (1938–1939, 1974–1985) 
A Brentford reserve team was entered into the London Midweek League for the 1938–39 season. The entry into the league was "to give promising young professionals, amateurs and any “finds” a test and to build up the playing strength". After the Brentford Reserve team was revived in 1974, the team re-entered the London Midweek League. The team's best finish was as runners-up in 1982–83.

Capital League (1984–1998) 
A reserve team was entered into the Capital League as founding members in 1984. Throughout its time in the league, the reserve team was competitive and won the title in 1987–88 and 1995–96. The team won the Capital League Cup in 1987–88, 1990–91, 1991–92 and 1994–95.

Development squad

Background 
The Brentford Development Squad was launched in May 2011. The Development Squad played its home matches at the club's training ground at Jersey Road, Osterley and a limited number of fixtures were played at Griffin Park. The team was made up of U21 players and was allowed to field three overage outfield players and one overage goalkeeper, which enabled first team fringe players to get game time. Scholars were also eligible to play for the Development Squad. After impressing during the 2011–12 pre-season, Jake Reeves became the first Development Squad player to be promoted into the first team squad. Charlie Adams, Josh Clarke and Mark Smith also graduated from the team. Josh Clarke made the most competitive appearances for the team during its existence (64) and Jan Holldack, Luke Norris and Jermaine Udumaga tied as top scorers with 14 goals each. The Development Squad model was abandoned in May 2016. Speaking about the shortcomings of Professional Development League football, then-academy conditioning coach James Purdue stated in October 2020 that "one of the big things for us was that, physically, the players weren’t challenged enough to put them in a place where they were ready to step into first team football. We looked a lot at data from U23 games and it wasn’t comparable to first team football".

History (2011–2016) 
The Development Squad played friendly matches during the 2011–12 season. It won its first silverware in August 2011, with a 3–2 victory over Bedfont Sports claiming the Hounslow Borough Cup. The team entered the Professional Development League 2 South for the 2012–13 season and finished fourth, two places away from qualifying for the knockout stage. The 2013–14, 2014–15 and 2015–16 seasons yielded poor finishes near the bottom of the table. The team entered the U21 Premier League Cup for only time in the 2015–16 season and reached the quarter-finals.

Brentford B

Original incarnation (1890s) 
The original Brentford B team was active during the 1890s and functioned as the third XI, below the first team and reserve team. From the beginning of the 1899–1900 season, the B team was renamed Brentford Thursday.

Relaunch (2016–present)

Background 
After the Brentford Academy was closed at the end of the 2015–16 season, the Development Squad was renamed Brentford B. The team plays friendly matches against senior, U23, U21 and academy teams, with a squad of players aged from 17 to 21. In addition, the team plays in friendly cup competitions and entered competitive cups for the first time during the 2018–19 season. The players and staff are part of an ongoing exchange of information with Brentford's partner club FC Midtjylland. Owner Matthew Benham revealed in July 2016 that, with the club needing to focus on the first team and its new stadium, "the B team seemed like a simpler and more attractive option". Then-Head of Football Operations Robert Rowan stated that the team's initial objective was to promote at least one player into the first team squad by the end of the 2016–17 season, which was achieved when left back Tom Field signed a new contract and was promoted in December 2016. By November 2022, 25 B team contracted and loan players had made a first team appearance.

Robert Rowan described the recruitment process as being to identify "different leagues where the physical qualities are often overlooked in favour of the tactical qualities, whereas in England if you are physical you have a good chance of being a good player. The tactical side of things can be taught" and that "there isn’t much point in us going to scout young talent in lower league clubs as every Premier League club can out-spend and out-resource us". A 2022 article in The Athletic stated that "Brentford often sign players for their B team who have fallen out of favour or been released from Premier League academies. Non-League sides have proven to be a fertile hunting ground too". Following the reopening of the Brentford academy in July 2022, the club's new U18 team fed into the B team.

Speaking about the benefits of the B team for the players, strength and conditioning coach James Purdue stated in October 2020 that "the games programme tests them more physically and better prepares them for first team football. It’s also treated a lot more like a first team so the environment that they’re used to is not dissimilar when they step up, as we’ve seen with our players over the course of the last four years, the transition becomes easier. It doesn’t mean they’re ready to slot straight in all the time, but it means that they understand the requirements".

Home stadiums 
The B team is based at Brentford's Jersey Road training ground and plays the majority of its home matches there. Prior to Brentford moving out of Griffin Park in 2020, the B team played occasional home matches at the ground. The grounds of AFC Wimbledon, Hanwell Town, Metropolitan Police, Bedfont Sports, Woking, Stevenage and Sutton United have also been utilised for home fixtures.

Matches, cup competitions and tours 
Brentford B does not play in a league and its fixtures are arranged independently. The B team's first fixture took place on 9 July 2016, against UC Santa Barbara Gauchos at Jersey Road, which resulted in a 4–1 victory to the Bees. The team's debut season featured victories over U23 teams from Manchester United, Liverpool (on penalties), West Bromwich Albion, Queens Park Rangers, Reading and Wolverhampton Wanderers. On 27 August 2020, the team played the final match at Griffin Park, a 6–3 London Senior Cup semi-final win over Erith Town. 

Since its maiden cup appearance at the Kai Thor Cup in 2017, the team has entered a number of friendly and competitive cup competitions, including the Middlesex Senior Cup, the London Senior Cup, the Korantina Homes Cup, the Atlantic Cup, the Premier League Cup and one-off cup competitions. The team's cup wins include the 2017 Kai Thor Cup, the 2018–19 Middlesex Senior Cup and the 2021–22 London Senior Cup.

Aside from overseas training camps, the team has toured Germany, Italy, Republic of Ireland, Portugal, Cyprus, Spain and the Netherlands.

Youth team

History (1893–2012) 
A Brentford youth team won the West Middlesex Junior Cup in 1893–94. A new youth team, named Brentford Town Juniors, was launched in 1948 and won the Hounslow Minor Shield in its inaugural season. Products of the team included Alan Bassham, George Bristow, Roy Hart and George Lowden. The youth team reached the semi-finals of the FA Youth Cup in 1952–53, succumbing 8–1 on aggregate to the eventual winners Manchester United. Under the stewardship of Alf Bew and because of the financial constraints imposed on the first team, the youth team of the early 1950s was particularly productive, yielding Vernon Avis, Johnny Pearson, Gerry Cakebread, Dennis Heath, Jim Towers and George Francis. Following financial problems in 1967, the youth team was disbanded, but was revived again in 1972 with money raised by supporters. The youth team won a youth tournament in Frankfurt the following year, beating Frem in the final, with Richard Poole top-scoring. Along with Poole, Kevin Harding and Roy Cotton progressed to play league football with the first team, while Gary Huxley won England Youth international honours. The youth team ceased playing competitive fixtures at the end of the 1973–74 season.

The youth team was revived for the 1980–81 season. A team containing a young Keith Millen was crowned champions of the South East Counties League in 1983–84. A second FA Youth Cup semi-final was reached in 1988–89, in which Brentford were beaten by Watford. After the dissolution of the South East Counties League, the youths later competed in the Football League Youth Alliance and, competing as an U19 team, they were Merit Division One South champions in 2001–02 and 2002–03. The youths had a memorable run in the FA Youth Cup during the 2005–06 season, beating Arsenal in the third round on penalties after extra time and finally succumbing 2–1 to Newcastle United in the fifth round. The team enjoyed another run in the 2011–12 FA Youth Cup, beating Lewes, Southend United and Hull City before being knocked out in the fourth round by Stoke City.

Brentford U18 (2012–2016, 2022–present) 
Under the Elite Player Performance Plan, the Brentford Youth Team was officially renamed as the Brentford U18 team in 2012 (though it continued to be colloquially known as the "youth team") and fielded scholars, U16s and U15s. The U18s entered the Professional U18 Development League 2 South for the 2012–13 season, finishing bottom. The U18 team reached the final of the Middlesex Senior Youth Cup in 2013, but were defeated 6–1 by Wealdstone. The U18s finished 2013–14 season second-from-bottom in the Professional U18 Development League 2 South table.

In December 2014, the team was invited to take part in the prestigious IMG Cup: Boys Invitational at the IMG Academy in Bradenton, Florida and finished the tournament tied in fifth position with United States U17. Late in the 2014–15 season, the U18s qualified for the Professional U18 Development League 2 South knockout stage for the first time, after finishing second to Charlton Athletic in the league stage. The team progressed to the final of the knockout stage, suffering a 1–0 defeat to Charlton Athletic. 10 second-year scholars graduated from the U18 team to sign professional contracts in April 2015, the generation which had previously won the Junior category at the 2012 Milk Cup while U15s. Amidst upheaval behind the scenes and with many of its best players playing predominantly for the Development Squad, the U18s finished the 2015–16 season in eighth place. The academy was closed at the end of the 2015–16 season and the team ceased to exist, with the majority of the scholars being released or sold. During the team's four-year history, the highest appearance-maker was Zain Westbrooke (55) and Bradley Clayton top-scored (20).

In July 2022, the reopening of the Brentford academy saw the creation of a new U18 team and it took part in the EFL Youth Alliance South East Conference, the EFL Youth Alliance Cup and the FA Youth Cup during the 2022–23 season. The team is run in conjunction with the club's Community Sports Trust.

Other teams

A Team (1920s–1930s, 1940s, 1959–1961) 
A third Brentford team, known as Brentford A, was active in the late 1920s and early 1930s and then again from 1948. The team later competed in the Seanglian League in 1959–60 and finished in mid-table. The As fared worse the following season, finishing second from bottom and was disbanded. The team was managed by former first team goalkeeper Ted Gaskell, with Eddie Lyons as his assistant. Future key players John Docherty, Tommy Higginson and Peter Gelson began their Brentford careers in the team.

C Team (1890s) 
Brentford C functioned as a fourth XI and was active during the 1890s. It later became known as Brentford Old Boys.

Elite Development Education Football Programme (2014–present) 
The Brentford FC Community Sports Trust, in partnership with West Thames College, runs an Elite Development Education Football Programme, which sees boys between the ages of 16–18 train with the club three times a week, while also studying for BTEC courses at the college. The course also provides the opportunity for the players to gain FA coaching qualifications. Between 2014 and 2018, two U19 teams, Brentford Griffins and Brentford Bees, participated in the Football Conference Youth Alliance and the National League U19 Alliance and played their home matches at King's House Sports Ground. The teams played their inaugural seasons in 2014–15 and Brentford Griffins won the Football Conference Youth Alliance London & South East division title. Despite the title win, coach Dan Wright revealed that the teams had fallen short of providing new scholars for the academy. Brentford Griffins again finished champions in the 2015–16 season, winning Division F' and advancing to the playoff semi-finals.

From the beginning of the 2016–17 season, the Griffins and Bees became the de facto replacement for the Youth Team, offering a pathway to the B team for local teenage players of the required standard. In 2016, Ellery Balcombe became the first player to graduate from the programme and sign a professional B team contract. In 2018, Brentford Griffins and Bees were merged to form a single team, Brentford CST Bees, which entered the National League U19 Alliance and finished fourth in Division C. An additional CST team entered the Community & Education Football Alliance (CEFA) for the 2018–19 season and reached the final of the CEFA Regional Cup. Jason Evans, a player for Brentford CST Bees and the club's CEFA team, was nominated for the CEFA Player of the Year award at the 2019 EFL Awards. The number of CEFA teams was increased to three for the 2019–20 season, under the names Bees, Griffins and Reds. Also in the 2019–20 season, a team was entered into the South Premier Division of the National Youth Football League. As of October 2020, former Brentford youth graduate Ryan Peters was running the programme. Following the reopening of the Brentford academy during the 2022 off-season, the U18 academy team fielded the Community Sports Trust's players during the 2022–23 season.

Centre of Excellence
The Brentford Centre of Excellence was formed to nurture youth talent and was headed by Barry Quin, Director Of Youth Football at the club for 20 years. Quin was succeeded in the role by Ose Aibangee in January 2010 and officially left the club in July 2010. During the interim period before academy status was awarded in July 2013, Brentford operated a four-tier youth system – Development Squad (ages 18–21), U18 (ages 16–18), Junior Centre of Excellence (ages 9–15) and Pre-Academy (age 9 and under). The Centre of Excellence ceased to exist in 2013.

Academy

Beginnings, planning and function (2010–2016)

Plans to upgrade the Centre Of Excellence to an academy began in 2010 after the takeover of the club by Matthew Benham. In December 2012, permission was granted by Hillingdon Council's South and Central Planning Committee for Brentford to build a Category Two Academy on the grounds of Uxbridge High School. The academy facility was paid for by the club, with a contribution from the school. In July 2013, the academy was awarded Category Two status for the next three years. Brentford was the only League One club to make the advance from a Centre Of Excellence to a Category Two Academy.

At the official opening of the academy in January 2014, Ose Aibangee predicted that by 2019, a Brentford academy graduate would be selected for the England national team. In April 2014, after the first team's promotion to the Championship for the 2014–15 season, then-U18 defender Richard Bryan said he believed that the academy could step up to produce players to play at Championship level, saying "for all the players here that want to get into the first team, it is definitely another step up and a harder challenge, but they have got to step up to the plate and be ready for it. There is a hunger in the team and in the coaches".

An indicator of the academy beginning to bear fruit was evidenced by the call ups of Joshua Bohui, Harry Francis and Ross McMahon to England and Scotland youth-level training camps respectively during the 2014–15 season. Julius Fenn-Evans won Wales U16 caps in April 2015, Ian Poveda represented England at U16 level in August 2015 and Joshua Bohui made his England U17 debut in February 2016. In March 2018, central defender Chris Mepham became the first former academy player to be capped at full international level (by Wales) and in January 2019 he transferred away from the club for an undisclosed fee, reported to be £12 million. In March 2022, Crystal Palace left back Tyrick Mitchell became the first former Brentford academy player to be capped by England at full international level.

Facility

The Brentford Academy was based in an indoor facility on the grounds of Uxbridge High School and became fully operational in November 2013. The academy building contained a 60m x 50m third-generation AstroTurf pitch, learning zones, changing rooms, a gym and a physiotherapy room. The academy was officially opened on 16 January 2014, by FA chairman and former Brentford chairman Greg Dyke.

Closure (2016) 
On 11 May 2016, a statement from co-directors of football Phil Giles and Rasmus Ankersen revealed that prior the beginning of the 2016–17 season, Brentford would withdraw from the Elite Player Performance Plan, the Professional Development League and would no longer run a full academy system between U8 and U21 level. Owner Matthew Benham later revealed the reasons for the closure in an open letter, saying "it is a competitive area, there are lots of academies in London. The risk is you have a great player, but he defects at the age of 16 and you get peanuts in return. In theory the player builds up loyalty to the club, but in practice there are other factors and the parents have an influence. EPPP made it difficult to run an academy, but also there is only so much the club can focus on. Overall, it seems to be difficult for smaller academies to keep hold of players".

A 2017 article in The Guardian stated that "at a cost of around £2m a year, Brentford decided it was simply too much of a risk that their academy – with so much competition on its doorstep in London – would produce enough first team players to make that investment worthwhile". Co-director of football Rasmus Ankersen stated in 2020 that "for every player produced who is good enough for the first team, there are seven or eight who don’t make it. You can accept that if, when that one player comes through in whom you have invested so much, [his sale] can effectively pay for the rest. But when those talents did come through, their scholarships ended at 17, they became free agents and went off and joined Manchester United and Manchester City. We ended up getting something ridiculous, like £30,000, because that’s what they judge their training to have been worth. It’s like having a winning lottery ticket and then someone comes along and steals it".

Reopening (2022) 
In December 2021, a public consultation began regarding a new planning application for improved facilities at Brentford's Jersey Road training ground. With the Brentford's promotion to the Premier League in 2021, the club stated that new facilities could be utilised for a "football academy in line with UEFA requirements". With aspirations of the first team playing in European competitions, "UEFA rules stipulate that clubs who wish to take part in its competitions have to operate an academy, otherwise they will be refused entry". Following the preservation of Brentford's Premier League status at the end of the 2021–22 season, it was reported that talks were underway to reopen the academy. In July 2022, Brentford was accepted into the 2022–23 FA Youth Cup. Also in July 2022, a new Premier League ruling stipulated that all member clubs must operate a category 3 academy by the beginning of the 2024–25 season. On 15 July 2022, Brentford announced that it had been "granted a licence to open and operate an Academy under the Elite Player Performance Plan" and would "initially open a Category Four Academy for the start of the 2022–23 season". The club signed players from U17 level upwards and fielded an U18 team during the 2022–23 season. In March 2023, Brentford opened a Development Centre for players between the ages of 9 and 16, which would transition into an academy one year later.

Teams

U17 
The U17 team played outside the United Kingdom for the first time when they journeyed to the Netherlands for a friendly match against AZ Alkmaar's Academy on 29 October 2013, with Brentford running out 4–1 winners. The U17s entered the Milk Cup for the first time in 2014, going out on penalties to Club América in the Premier Section Globe semi-final.

U16 
On 29 October 2014, the U16s took on a Barcelona youth team in a prestigious friendly at La Masia. Brentford took the lead through Danny Parish, but lost 2–1. 12 members of the 2014–15 team signed scholarship deals in April 2015, with Parish being the only member of the group to sign a professional contract at Griffin Park.

U15 
Brentford made its Milk Cup debut in 2010 and finished 23rd out of 24 entries. The team had some joy in the competition's Dunluce Trophy, finishing as runners-up to County Down. The U15 team were winners of the Junior category at the 2012 Milk Cup, seeing off CSKA Moscow and Liverpool along the way and beating Everton in the final. The U15s again competed in the Junior category in 2013 Milk Cup and lost 3–2 to a Japan FA team in the Junior Vase final. The team were 2–1 victors over Inter Milan U15 in a friendly played at the Italian club's academy on 17 April 2014. At the 2014 Milk Cup, the U15s won the Junior Globe. The U15s were victorious at the 2015 Sportfan Football Festival in Lithuania, beating Skonto FC in the semi-finals and FM Vilnius in the final.

U14 
At the time of the resumption of the Brentford youth system in 1970, an U14 team was created and coached by former player Ken Horne.

U13 
In May 2016, the U13 team won the Elite Neon Cup in Greece, beating AEK Athens in the final.

U11 
In June 2014, an U11 team entered the 28-team Holstein Cup (held in Bad Oldesloe, Germany) and finished third in the tournament, behind Hertha 03 Zehlendorf and Borussia Mönchengladbach. In late February 2015, Brentford hosted a prestigious England vs Germany U11 tournament, featuring teams from the academies of Arsenal, Liverpool, Manchester United, Tottenham Hotspur, Bayern Munich, Hertha Berlin, Hannover 96 and Schalke 04. Brentford won the Silver Group to finish runners-up in the tournament, behind Manchester United. The U11s took part in the Mediterranean International Cup in April 2015, going out to Valencia in the last 16.

Partnerships
The academy had a number of partnerships with football clubs and sports organisations in and outside the UK:

UK

Uxbridge High School
North Hertfordshire College
AVC Sports Management
Elite Preparation Centre
CB Hounslow United
Football Magic Coaching
University of Westminster
Rural Friendly League
 Isledon Wolves
 West Thames College
 GSK Human Performance Lab

Europe 
 UMF Selfoss (Iceland)
 Combined Counties Football League (Ireland)
 FC Midtjylland (Denmark)
 Käpylän Pallo (Finland)

North America 
 Next Gen USA (United States)

Africa
Gulu United (Uganda)

Squad list

Brentford B

Staff

Current staff

Reserve team/Development Squad/B Team manager history

Youth team/U18 manager history

Awards

B Team Player of the Year

B Team Players' Player of the Year

Youth Team Player of the Year

Honours

Reserve Team/Development Squad/B Team Honours

Leagues 
Capital League

Winners (2): 1987–88, 1994–95

Great Western Suburban League

Winners (3): 1907–08, 1908–09, 1910–11

London Combination

Winners (2): 1931–32, 1932–33

London League First Division

Winners (1): 1908–09

London League Second Division

Winners (1): 1902–03

Cups
Capital League Cup

Winners (4): 1987–88, 1990–91, 1991–92, 1994–95

Hounslow Borough Cup

Winners (1): 2011

Kai Thor Cup

Winners (1): 2017

Middlesex Senior Cup

Winners (1): 2018–19
London Senior Cup

 Winners (1): 2021–22

Youth Team Honours

Leagues
Football League Youth Alliance Merit First Division South

Winners (2): 2001–02, 2002–03

South East Counties League

 Winners (1): 1983–84

Cups
Hounslow Minor Shield

 Winners (1): 1948–49

Chertsey Minor Cup

 Winners (1): 1949–50

Frankfurt International Youth Tournament

Winners (1): 1973

West Middlesex Junior Cup: 1

Winners (1): 1893–94

Royal Mail Cup

 Winners (2): 1996, 1998

Academy Team Honours

U15 
Milk Cup: 2

Winners (1): 2012 (Junior)
Winners (1): 2014 (Junior Globe)

Sportfan Football Festival

 Winners (1): 2015

U13 
Elite Neon Cup

 Winners (1): 2015

U11 
England v Germany Tournament

 Winners (1): 2015 (Silver Phase)

Other Honours

Brentford Griffins 
Football Conference Youth Alliance / National League U19 Alliance

Winners (1): 2014–15 (London & South East Division)
Winners (1): 2015–16 (Division F)

Noted graduates
Brentford's youth, reserve, Development Squad and B teams produced many players who made 25 or more appearances for the first team. Players marked * won a full international cap while with Brentford or later in their career. Players are listed according to the decade of their senior debut for the club.

And those who made it elsewhere

Many former Brentford schoolboy, youth, reserve, Development Squad, B team and CST players found success with other clubs. Those marked † did not make a senior appearance for Brentford, but made a first team appearance for another club in a fully professional league. Players marked * won an international cap while with Brentford or later in their career. Players are listed according to the decade of their senior debut or, if they did not make a senior appearance, the decade of their departure from the club.

International players
Brentford's youth, reserve, Development Squad and B teams have produced many players who were capped at full and youth international level during their career with the club.

Notes

References

External links
Brentford FC Official Website
Brentford B Player Profiles
Brentford B Fixtures & Results

Reserves
Brentford, London
Football academies in England
Association football clubs established in 1889
Football clubs in London
Southern Football League clubs
1889 establishments in England
Sport in the London Borough of Hounslow
London League (football)
Great Western Suburban League